A Music Express is an amusement ride  based on the original Caterpillar rides of Germany. Several near-identical ride designs are also produced by other companies: Musik Express by Italian company Bertazzon and US Majestic Rides, Himalaya by American company Wisdom Rides,
German company Mack, and French company Reverchon, and Silver Streak by Wisdom Rides. This ride is a modern adaptation of the famous Harry Traver Caterpillar rides.

Design and operation
The ride features twenty 3-passenger cars connected in a circle. These cars rotate on a track with alternating sloped and flat sections. Rotation is possible in both a backward and forward direction, as the ride is manually operated. The ride is powered by 4 DC motors, and can reach a maximum speed of 12 revolutions per minute. (Certain older models have a hydraulic tire/rim drive and they have a tendency to go faster).

The riders in each car are restrained by a single solid lap bar that is locked across the body of the car, making the ride unsuitable for young children or people of short stature. The bar must be manually locked or unlocked, and only locks in one position. Lights and music are also controlled by the operator, which (as the name suggests) contribute heavily to the ride experience. After a certain amount of rotations or minutes, the ride operator will be alerted by the control box that the speed is going to increase, usually by a light on the box. At that time the operator will speak on a microphone asking the riders if they would like to go faster. Sometimes the ride operator can do this earlier than the alert light to build suspense. After a minute or two of faster speed, the ride will then slow down, and the operator can then ask the riders if they would like to go backwards. The speed up element is then repeated again only done in reverse. Most parks and carnivals require riders to be at least 42 inches or even taller, depending on circumstances and ride design.

Most Musik Expresses are built with a backdrop dividing the rear third of the ride from the front two-thirds. This backdrop, normally covered in artwork and lights, and providing a mild headchopper-like effect as the riders enter and exit the rear section. As this blocks lines of sight, additional staff are required to safely supervise this ride in operation.

More common in Europe than the US, some Music Express rides have a canopy that the operator can cover the ride while in operation, very much like the old caterpillar rides.

At Kennywood Park's and Dorney Park & Wildwater Kingdom's Musik Express, written above are the words "Mit Musik Geht Alles Besser", which translated from German reads, "With Music Everything Goes Better."

The variant used in fairs across Hawaii feature murals of several famous artists, such as The Beatles, Jimi Hendrix, Janis Joplin, Elvis Presley, the logo of The Rolling Stones, and even fictional bands and singers.

Variations

 Bertazzon Musik Express No major variations from Mack Rides version.
 Majestic Manufacturing Musik Express 14 cars, hydraulic locking system, increased top RPM.
 Wisdom Rides Himalaya 22 cars.
 Mack Rides Himalaya Music Express, Diskothek

 Reverchon Himalaya Original Himalaya ride design.

 Wisdom Rides Silver Streak 16 cars, smaller height difference, multiple lap bar positions.

 SDC Amor Express Billed as "The Love Machine", circa late 70s, with hydraulic drive and canopy, very much like the original caterpillar rides. Not many found in US anymore but they still can be found in European fair circuits and parks.

Appearances

References

Amusement rides
Articles containing video clips